Yusefabad (also Romanized as Yūsefābād) is a village in Zahray-ye Pain Rural District, in the Central District of Buin Zahra County, Qazvin Province, Iran. At the 2006 census, its population was 45, in 9 families.

References 

Populated places in Buin Zahra County